Newtonville may refer to:

Places
Canada
 Newtonville, Ontario

United States
 Newtonville, Indiana
 Newtonville, Massachusetts, one of thirteen villages in Newton, Massachusetts
 Newtonville (MBTA station)
 Newtonville, New Jersey
 Newtonville, New York, a hamlet in Colonie, Albany County, New York

See also
 Newton (disambiguation)
 Newtown (disambiguation)
 New Town (disambiguation)
 Newville (disambiguation)
 New City (disambiguation)
 Villeneuve (disambiguation)